Sir Charles Frederick KB FRS (21 December 1709 – 18 December 1785) was a British politician who sat in the House of Commons from 1741 to 1784.

Early life
Frederick was the third son of Sir Thomas Frederick, sometime Governor of Fort St David, and his wife Mary Moncrieff, daughter of William Moncrieff and was born on 21 December 1709. He was a younger brother of Sir John Frederick, 4th Baronet. He was educated at Westminster School from 1719 to 1720 and matriculated at New College, Oxford on 19 March 1725. In 1728 he entered Middle Temple.  He was elected a Fellow of the Royal Society in May 1733. He undertook a Grand Tour through Italy, Constantinople, the near East and France with his brother John from 1737 to 1739.

Political career
Frederick was returned unopposed as Member of Parliament for New Shoreham in the 1741 general election and also in 1747. In the 1754 general election he was elected as MP for Queenborough in a contest. He was made a Knight Companion of the Order of the Bath in 1761. He was re-elected unopposed for Queenborough in 1761 and 1768 and topped the poll when the seat was contested in 1774. He was returned again for Queenborough unopposed in 1780. He was briefly Father of the House from June 1784.

Frederick was also appointed Clerk of the Deliveries in 1746 and promoted to Surveyor-General of the Ordnance in 1750. In 1782 however, he and his son were both removed from the Board of Ordnance by the then Master-General of the Ordnance, Charles Lennox, 3rd Duke of Richmond. His son, who was Architect of the Ordnance, was succeeded by James Wyatt who went on to build both the Royal Artillery Barracks and the Royal Military Academy, Woolwich.

Family and legacy
Frederick married Lucy Boscawen, daughter of the first Viscount Falmouth on 18 August 1746. His great-grandson Charles Edward later succeeded to the family title as 7th Baronet.

Frederick died on 18 December 1785. Frederick Place in Woolwich is named after him.

References
  (2012): Woolwich - Survey of London, Volume 48, Yale Books, London.  (online text)

|-

1709 births
1785 deaths
People educated at Westminster School, London
Alumni of New College, Oxford
Members of the Middle Temple
Knights Companion of the Order of the Bath
Members of the Parliament of Great Britain for English constituencies
British MPs 1741–1747
British MPs 1747–1754
British MPs 1754–1761
British MPs 1768–1774
British MPs 1774–1780
British MPs 1780–1784
Fellows of the Royal Society